Nerine bowdenii is a species of flowering plant in the family Amaryllidaceae. The common names of the species are Cornish lily, Cape flower, Guernsey lily, and Bowden lily. However, it is neither a true lily nor from Cornwall or Guernsey, but originates from South Africa (Eastern Cape, KwaZulu Natal, Free State, Drakensberg Mountains). Confusingly the name “Guernsey lily” is also applied to a related species, Nerine sarniensis.

The species was named in 1904 after Athelstan Cornish-Bowden who had sent bulbs of the plant to England from South Africa.

Description
The bulbs are "shaped like old-fashioned Chianti bottles". The plant has eight or more faintly-scented bright pink flowers with frilly tips, resembling finely-cut lilies. Because the leaves do not appear until spring, the species can tolerate lower temperatures than most species in the genus Nerine.

Cultivation
It needs to be planted where it cannot be disturbed for several years, and blooms best when the bulbs are crowded. The species grows best in heat and well-drained soil. However, it will not tolerate tropical or very humid weather. It is suggested that colchicums and cyclamens are good choices of companion plants to grow with this species.

Cultivars
The following cultivars have won the Royal Horticultural Society's Award of Garden Merit:-

 Nerine bowdenii (pink)
 'Isabel' (deep pink)
 'Quinton Wells' (bright pink)
 'Stefanie' (pale pink, recurved petals)
 'Zeal Giant' (deep salmon pink)

Biochemistry
The bulbs of Nerine bowdenii contain ungeremine, a betaine-type alkaloid, and a number of other alkaloids. Ungeremine is an inhibitor of acetylcholinesterase, and as such may be of interest in research into treatment of Alzheimer's disease. Ungeremine also has been isolated from a number of related plant species, such as Ungernia minor, Ungernia spiralis, Zephyranthes flava, Crinum asiaticum, Crinum augustum, Pancratium maritimum and Hippeastrum solandriflorum.

Diseases
The plant virus, vallota mosaic virus, has been found to infect Nerine bowdenii and other members of the genus Nerine in the UK.

See also

 List of plants known as lily

References

Amaryllidoideae
Flora of the Cape Provinces
Flora of KwaZulu-Natal
Plants described in 1904